First Baptist Church East Nashville is a historic church at 601 Main Street in Nashville, Tennessee.

The Classical Revival building was constructed in 1928 and added to the National Register of Historic Places in 2005.

References

Churches in Nashville, Tennessee
Nashville FirstBaptist East
Nashville FirstBaptist East
Nashville FirstBaptist East
Nashville FirstBaptist East
Nashville FirstBaptist East
National Register of Historic Places in Nashville, Tennessee
Neoclassical church buildings in the United States